8 Vulpeculae is star located about 457 light years away in the northern constellation of Vulpecula. It lies just  from Alpha Vulpeculae and the two form an optical double. 8 Vulpeculae is visible to the naked eye as a faint, yellow-orange hued star with an apparent visual magnitude of 5.82. It is moving closer to the Earth with a heliocentric radial velocity of −29 km/s.

This is an aging giant star with a stellar classification of K0 III, which indicates it has exhausted the hydrogen supply at its core and evolved away from the main sequence. It is 324 million years old with three times the mass of the Sun and has expanded to 14 times the Sun's radius. The star is radiating 100 times the Sun's luminosity from its enlarged photosphere at an effective temperature of 4,915 K.

References

External links
 

K-type giants
Vulpecula
Durchmusterung objects
Flamsteed objects
183491
095785
7406